Two lunar eclipses occurred in 1956: 

 24 May 1956 partial lunar eclipse
 18 November 1956 total lunar eclipse

See also 
 List of 20th-century lunar eclipses
 Lists of lunar eclipses